Rasmus Nissen Kristensen (born 11 July 1997) is a Danish professional footballer who plays as a right-back for  club Leeds United and the Denmark national team.

Youth career
Kristensen was born to a footballing family and began playing football in Brande IF when he was six years old. He played in the club for six years, before joining Herning Fremad where he played for two years. In 2012, Kristensen signed a youth contract with FC Midtjylland.

Club career

FC Midtjylland
Kristensen was promoted to the first team squad in summer 2016 at the age of 18 and signed a five-year professional contract.

At the age of 18, Kristensen got his official debut for FCM on 7 March 2016, in a Superliga match against FC Nordsjælland. He started on the bench, but replaced Václav Kadlec in the 39th minute in a match, which FCM lost 1–2. He turned into a key player for the team in the 2016–17 season.

Ajax
On 23 January 2018, Kristensen joined Ajax on a four-and-a-half-year contract.

RB Salzburg
After one and a half years with Ajax, Kristensen moved to Austria and joined Austrian Football Bundesliga club FC Red Bull Salzburg on a five-year contract.

Leeds United
On 8 June 2022, Kristensen joined Premier League club Leeds United on a five year contract for an undisclosed fee in the region of £10 million. He will play for the team from 1 July 2022, and became Leeds's second confirmed arrival of the summer transfer window, reuniting with former Salzburg teammate Brenden Aaronson. He made his senior league debut for Leeds as part of the starting eleven in their season opener on 6 August with a 2-1 home win over Wolverhampton Wanderers. On 18 March 2023, he scored seconds after coming on as a substitute in Leeds’ 4-2 win at Molineux against Wolverhampton.

International career
In November 2020, he was called up to Kasper Hjulmand's senior squad due to several cancellations from, among others, the Danish national team players playing in England, due to the COVID-19 restrictions, as well as a case of COVID-19 in the squad, which had put several national team players in quarantine.

He made his debut for the Denmark national football team on 4 September 2021 in a World Cup qualifier against the Faroe Islands, a 1–0 away victory. He started the game and was substituted at half-time.

Personal life
Kristensen is the nephew of the former Sturm Graz player Sigurd Kristensen and is the cousin of Leon Jessen.

Career statistics

Club

International

Honours
Ajax
 Eredivisie: 2018–19
 KNVB Cup: 2018–19

Red Bull Salzburg
Austrian Bundesliga: 2019–20, 2020–21, 2021–22
Austrian Cup: 2019–20, 2020–21, 2021–22

Individual
 Austrian Bundesliga Team of the Year: 2020–21, 2021–22

References

External links
 
 Rasmus Kristensen at DBU

1997 births
Living people
People from Ikast-Brande Municipality
Sportspeople from the Central Denmark Region
Danish men's footballers
Association football defenders
Danish Superliga players
FC Midtjylland players
AFC Ajax players
Eredivisie players
FC Red Bull Salzburg players
Austrian Football Bundesliga players
Premier League players
Leeds United F.C. players
2022 FIFA World Cup players
Denmark youth international footballers
Denmark under-21 international footballers
Denmark international footballers
Danish expatriate men's footballers
Danish expatriate sportspeople in the Netherlands
Expatriate footballers in the Netherlands
Danish expatriate sportspeople in Austria
Expatriate footballers in Austria
Danish expatriate sportspeople in England
Expatriate footballers in England